Coelogyne fuerstenbergiana is a species of orchid.

References

fuerstenbergiana